Pudahuel is a Chilean radio station located at 90.5 MHz of the FM dial in Santiago de Chile. It also transmits to the rest of the country with its network of repeaters, and via internet for the rest of the world.

His institutional voice is that of Balmores Fajardo.

History 
Radio Pudahuel began broadcasting on October 15, 1968, under the wing of the society Blaya and Vega, composed by Joaquin Blaya Barrios and Ricardo Vega, also the radio was under the partnership of Blaya and Campo Limitada composed by Joaquin Blaya Barrios and Pedro del Campo Benavente. Its name derives from the commune where were its first studies and that had just changed its name. In 1970 he moved to the center of Santiago, to Miraflores 130.

It is one of the oldest Modulated Frequency Radios in Chile, and since its inception it has been 90.5 FM in Santiago de Chile, as well as the long and extensive network of stations throughout the country that it has acquired over time.

In its beginnings, the radio was popular cut and news, without marking a clear style. It was only in 1979, when the radio moved to Las Condes, which was adopted an Anglo-pop style, which was maintained until 1985, when he turned to a Latin style after Pablo Aguilera's arrival to the station, which earned him For a long time the first place of audience, according to Ipsos surveys of the time, especially between the late 80s and mid 90s, being great competition for the now defunct Radio Aurora (today Radio Imagina). Thus were created the slogans like La radio de Chile, El sonido de Chile or La primera en tu corazón, con toda razón.

At the end of the 1980s, its expansion began throughout the country. The first cities to expand were Valparaiso in 107.7 FM (today 105.7 FM) and then the city of Curicó in 93.9 FM. Since 1993 it has achieved national coverage, becoming the radio with the country's first satellite network. Note that none of the Santiago radios had a satellite network in those years that covered the whole country, only some capital stations had stations of their own, while others came to regions only by associated radios.

Today Radio Pudahuel has a program directed especially to middle-class women. Currently, according to the latest measurement of Ipsos, Pudahuel is among the 5 most-heard stations in Santiago, a situation that is repeated in much of the country. In 1999 the company Blaya y Vega - owner of Pudahuel and administrator of the frequency 89.3 FM of Santiago, belonging to the Pontificia Universidad Católica de Chile - is acquired by Ibero Americana Radio Chile.

Broadcaster 

Current:
 Balmores Fajardo
 Juan La Rivera
 Angélica Guerrero
 Pablo Aguilera
 María Fernanda "Titi" García Huidobro
 Claudia Sáez
 Alejandro Chávez
 Daniela Aguilera
 Pato Cisternas "El Hacedor de Hambre""

Former:
 Christian Gordon
 Luis Alejandro Rojas
 Luis Jara (1997)
 Esperanza Silva (2000-2003)
 Rafael Araneda (2000-2002)
 Bárbara Rebolledo (2000-2001)
 Patricio Frez (1990-2006)
 Renata Bravo (2002-2007)
 Francisco López (2003)
 Catalina Droguett (2004-2006)
 Carolina Julio
 Carlos Bencini
 Cristián Pérez
 Ignacio Gutiérrez
 Leo Caprile (2007-2011)
 Catalina Telias (2008)
 Martín Cárcamo (2009)
 Sergio "Pirincho" Cárcamo (1992-1999)
 Rodriguinho (2009-2011)

Slogans 
 Pudahuel, la Superstereo (1968-1972)
 Es superior (1973-1976)
 El sonido joven (1977-1980)
 Su Radio Amorosa (1981-1984)
 La primera en tu corazón... Con toda razón (1985-1992)
 El sonido de Chile (1993-2000)
 Pudahuel...uniendo Chile desde Arica a Punta Arenas..es más música
 Primera red satelital de Chile (1996-2000)
 La radio de Chile (2000–present)
 Pudahuel es mi radio (2003)
 Pudahuel te escucha, escucha Pudahuel (2006-presente)

References

External links 

 
 Ibero Americana Radio Chile
 PRISA

Radio stations in Chile
Mass media in Santiago
Radio stations established in 1968
1968 establishments in Chile